Velika Hubajnica (in older sources also Velika Hubanjica) is a settlement west of Studenec in the Municipality of Sevnica in central Slovenia. The area is part of the historical region of Lower Carniola. The municipality is now included in the Lower Sava Statistical Region.

References

External links
Velika Hubajnica at Geopedia

Populated places in the Municipality of Sevnica